Nicolae Nicoleanu (born Neagoe Tomoșoiu; June 16, 1835–April 7, 1871) was an Imperial Austrian-born Romanian poet.

Born in Cernatu Săcelelor, a village near Brașov in the Austrian Empire, he crossed into Wallachia to attend the episcopal seminary in Buzău, followed by the National College in Craiova. Aged 23, he left for Paris, returning three years later after passing through Berlin and Antwerp. He began his journalistic career at C. A. Rosetti's Românul. At age 27, having moved to Moldavia, he was a clerk in Roman; at 29, he was a school director in the provincial capital Iași. He then worked as a clerk at the State Archives; spent a year as school inspector for Iași, Vaslui and Fălciu counties; was a clerk in the Education Ministry and a secretary at the State Archives in the Wallachian capital Bucharest. He went insane at age 33 and never recovered, dying at a hospice in Pantelimon. His only published book, a collection of verses called Poezii and prefaced by Iacob Negruzzi, appeared at Iași in 1865.

Notes

1835 births
1871 deaths
People from Săcele
Romanian people in the Principality of Transylvania (1711–1867)
Austro-Hungarian emigrants to Romania
Romanian poets
Romanian journalists
Romanian civil servants
Romanian archivists
Heads of schools in Romania
19th-century poets